Urguri Nunatak (‘Nunatak Urguri’ \'nu-na-tak ur-'gu-ri\) is the rocky hill rising to 574 m in the east foothills of Laclavère Plateau on Trinity Peninsula in Graham Land, Antarctica.  It is overlooking Mott Snowfield to the north.

The nunatak is named after the ancient and medieval fortress of Urguri in Southeastern Bulgaria.

Location
German-British mapping in 1996.

Maps
 Trinity Peninsula. Scale 1:250000 topographic map No. 5697. Institut für Angewandte Geodäsie and British Antarctic Survey, 1996.
 Antarctic Digital Database (ADD). Scale 1:250000 topographic map of Antarctica. Scientific Committee on Antarctic Research (SCAR). Since 1993, regularly updated.

Notes

References
 Urguri Nunatak. SCAR Composite Antarctic Gazetteer
 Bulgarian Antarctic Gazetteer. Antarctic Place-names Commission. (details in Bulgarian, basic data in English)

External links
 Urguri Nunatak. Copernix satellite image

Nunataks of Trinity Peninsula
Bulgaria and the Antarctic